CSDA may refer to:
 CSDA (genetics), a gene
 Certified Software Development Associate, a certification in software engineering
 in particle physics, the continuous slowing down approximation range, i.e. the path length after which a particle of a given kinetic energy is stopped, assuming it losts its energy continuously.
 Creation Seventh Day Adventist Church